Janjac (Cyrillic: Јањац) is a village in the City of Zenica, Bosnia and Herzegovina.

Demographics 
According to the 2013 census, its population was 111.

References

Populated places in Zenica